Suzanne B. Labarge  (born 1940) is a Canadian businesswoman, and past chancellor of McMaster University. Labarge is a member of The Coca-Cola Company's board of directors, and was the vice-chairman of the Royal Bank of Canada.

Career
Labarge was born in Canada. Labarge received a B.A. in Economics from McMaster University, and a M.B.A. from Harvard Business School. Then she worked in the federal public service, including 2 years as assistant auditor general and 8 years in the Office of the Superintendent of Financial Institutions.

She joined the Royal Bank of Canada where she became the first woman to be appointed as a Royal Bank executive in 1979, and Executive Vice-President in 1995. In 1999, she became RBC's Chief Risk Officer. During her time with RBC, she served as the chief risk officer of RBC Capital Markets Corporation and RBC Capital Markets. Labarge served as the chief risk officer of Royal Bank of Canada until September 2004 and its executive vice president and corporate treasurer from 1995 to 1998. Labarge had served as the chief risk officer at RBC Financial Group and the vice chairman at RBC Capital Markets Corporation and RBC Capital Markets. She served as the vice chairman at RBC Financial Group. Labarge served as vice chairman of Royal Bank of Canada until September 2004.

Labarge assumed the role of chancellor at McMaster University on 1 September 2013, and served a three-year term. In the previous year, Labarge contributed C$10 million to the university in an effort to fund inter-disciplinary research into the subject of aging. The university operates the Labarge Optimal Ageing Initiative. In 2007, she had endowed the Raymond and Margaret Labarge Chair in Research and Knowledge Application for Optimal Aging.

Labarge made a second gift to the University in October 2016. This gift, valued at C$15 million, established the Labarge Centre for Mobility in Aging. The focus of the Centre is to fund "interdisciplinary research into ways seniors can live more independently through greater mobility, better health and fitness and increased social connection."

Other roles
 Since December 2007: Director at Coca-Cola s.
 January 2005-May 2007: Independent Director at Novelis Inc.
 Previously: Director at XL Group
 Previously: Member of supervisory board at Deutsche Bank AG and of Deutsche Bank AG
 Chairwoman of CLS Group (2001-2003)

Distinctions
 2000: Awards of Distinction by the Concordia University
 2019: Member of the Order of Canada.

References

1940 births
Living people
Harvard Business School alumni
Chancellors of McMaster University
McMaster University alumni
Directors of The Coca-Cola Company
Canadian women in business
Women business executives